Marburger is a German surname. Notable people with the surname include:

 John Marburger (1941–2011), American physicist 
 Manuel Marburger (born 1973), German industrial climber

See also
 Marburg, town in Hesse, Germany

German-language surnames